Secretary for Transport and Public Works was a bureau secretary in Portuguese Macau. The Secretary headed the Secretariat for Transport and Public Works (Secretaria dos Transportes e Obras Públicas). This was the only department to remain intact after the 1999 handover (see Secretariat for Transport and Public Works (Macau)).

The role for Communications from the old Secretary for Public Works and Communications was transferred to the Secretary for Tourism and Culture.

List of responsibilities:

List of departments
 Cartography and Cadastre Bureau
 Port Authority
 Macau Post - created from the old Posts, Telegraphs and Telephones
 Meteorological and Geophysical Bureau
 Housing
 Environmental Protection Committee
 Civil Aviation Authority
 Infrastructure Development Office
 Energy Sector Development Office
 Bureau of Telecommunications Regulation - created from the old Posts, Telegraphs and Telephones 
 Land, Public works and Transport Bureau (Macau)
 Maritime Administration

List of Secretariats

 Alves Paula

Deputy Secretaries

 Vasco Joaquim Rocha Vieira 1974-1975 (Public Works and Communications); last Governor 1991-1999

See also
 Transport in Macau

References
 Casa de Macau - references to former Portuguese secretaries

External links
  -- homepage

Government departments and agencies of Macau
Transport and Public Works, Secretariat for
Macau
Political office-holders in Macau
Positions of the Macau Government
1999 disestablishments in Macau
Transport organizations based in China